The East Anglian derby is a sobriquet used to describe football matches held between Norwich City and Ipswich Town, the only fully professional football clubs in the neighbouring East Anglian counties of Norfolk and Suffolk respectively. In recent years it has sometimes been humorously called the Old Farm derby, a reference to the Old Firm derby played between rival Glasgow clubs Celtic and Rangers, and to the  prominence of agriculture in East Anglia. The derby has been described as the second-fiercest rivalry in England.

Including friendly meetings, there have been 148 instances of the derby overall with Ipswich winning 60 to Norwich's 58. In competitive meetings, the balance tips equally narrowly the other way with Norwich having won 47 to Ipswich's 45. The series began in the early 20th century, when both clubs were amateur organisations, with the first derby between the two professional clubs taking place in 1939. The most recent was on 10 February 2019, which Norwich City won 3–0 at their ground, Carrow Road. It has been more than thirteen years since Ipswich won the derby: their last win was on 19 April 2009, a 3–2 at Portman Road, and they have not won at Carrow Road since 5 February 2006.

Winning the derby is one measure used to determine which club from the region can declare itself the "Pride of Anglia".

As of the 2022–23 season, Norwich play in the second tier of English football and Ipswich play in the third tier. Therefore for the immediate future the next competitive derby would be if the two teams are drawn together in a cup competition.

Style and atmosphere
According to the Football Rivalries Report 2008, the East Anglian derby is the second-fiercest rivalry in England, after the Black Country derby between West Bromwich Albion and Wolverhampton Wanderers. The report stated, "The gap of 40 miles doesn't make those East Anglia 'Old Farm' derbies any less intense, and this, combined with the regularity and closeness of the games, and the recent fortunes of both clubs, put it ahead of all but one rivalry in League football."

Former referee Keith Hackett said of the East Anglian derby: 
"As for the most aggressive atmosphere that I’ve ever encountered, believe it or not it was at Carrow Road for Norwich v Ipswich Town. There are certain derby fixtures that you always know are going to be highly charged, but the East Anglian derby tops the lot. The players came out of the tunnel as if they were ready for a boxing match. The noise was intense and aggressive."

Rob Hadgraft, who wrote The Old Farm, suggested some reasons for the intensity of the rivalry: "I think it's because each club represents the entire county ... There's only one club in Norfolk, and the same goes for Suffolk ... The people live up to 40 miles apart, so they don't mingle and have pals who support the other lot ... you've got two sets of fans who never really mingle or mix, and there's no proper friendships. They really do despise each other."

History

The first derby was held between the two clubs on 15 November 1902, when both sides were still playing at an amateur level. The Norfolk & Suffolk League fixture was played in Norwich and finished 1–0 to Norwich City. Norwich turned professional in 1905 with Ipswich following in 1936. Ipswich Town was elected to the Football League in 1938, and the first league game between the two clubs took place on 2 September 1939 in the Third Division South. Played at Portman Road, the match finished 1–1, although the league was abandoned a few days later following the outbreak of the Second World War.

As the clubs have tended to play in the same division over the years, the derby has been contested in most seasons since this time, the longest gap being for a period of six seasons between 1986–87 and 1991–92 inclusive. Since Norwich's promotion to the Premier League and Ipswich's relegation to League One at the end of the 2018–19 season the two teams have been at least a division apart, and the derby has not been contested since February 2019.

Two of the more notable meetings between the two clubs have come in cup competitions. In the 1972–73 season Ipswich beat Norwich 4–2 on aggregate to win the two-legged Texaco Cup, with 2–1 wins in both legs. In 1985 the clubs met in the semi-final of the League Cup, with a place in the Wembley final at stake. Ipswich won the first leg 1–0 at Portman Road, but Norwich scored early in the return leg at Carrow Road to level the tie. With extra-time looming, Steve Bruce scored a late winner to send Norwich to Wembley.

In the 2014–15 season there were four East Anglian derbies, because the sides met in a two legged Championship play-off semi-final in addition to the regular two league games played during the season. The first match of the season was held at Portman Road on 23 August; it finished with Norwich winning 1–0. The reverse fixture at Carrow Road was on 1 March and Norwich again won, this time 2–0. The two play-off ties were held on 9 and 16 May, the first at Ipswich. The first leg finished 1–1, and the second leg finished with Norwich taking their third derby victory of the season by winning 3–1 and therefore booking their place in the play-off final at Wembley.

Statistics
The derby has been contested 115 times in competitive games, 58 of which have been played at Ipswich and 57 at Norwich. In these, Norwich have won 47 times and Ipswich 45, with 23 matches ending as draws. The clubs have also played each other in friendlies and testimonial matches. In total, including friendly matches, the derby has been contested 148 times, with Ipswich having 60 victories and Norwich having 58 victories, with 30 matches finishing as draws. The highest attendance in the derby at Portman Road is 35,077 for a First Division match in September 1975, while Carrow Road hosted 39,890 spectators for an FA Cup match in January 1962. John Wark is Ipswich's leading goalscorer in the derby with nine goals, while Hugh Curran remains Norwich's top scorer with five, a record that has stood since 1968.

A team has scored five goals in a derby match on five occasions – Ipswich in 1946–47, 1947–48, 1976–77 and 1997–98, and Norwich in 2010–11. The highest aggregate score in a match is seven goals, Ipswich winning 4–3 in a Second Division match at Carrow Road in 1968–69. At least six players have scored hat-tricks in derby matches – Hugh Curran in 1968–69 and Grant Holt in 2010–11 for Norwich, and Albert Day in 1946–47, Colin Viljoen in 1967–68, Trevor Whymark in 1976–77, and Alex Mathie in 1997–98 for Ipswich.

A summary of derby games in individual competitions, as of 10 February 2019, is shown below.

See also
Pride of Anglia

References

Ipswich Town F.C.
Norwich City F.C.
England football derbies